Morochata Municipality is the second municipal section of the Ayopaya Province in the Cochabamba Department, Bolivia. Its seat is Morochata.

Geography 
Some of the highest mountains of the municipality are listed below:

References 

 Instituto Nacional de Estadistica de Bolivia

Municipalities of the Cochabamba Department